Anthony J. Adams (12 October 1940 – 16 July 2021) was an Australian-American optometrist. He was an emeritus professor of optometry and vision science at the UC Berkeley School of Optometry, where he also served as dean from 1992 to 2001.

Education and career
Adams spent his childhood in Kew, Victoria and obtained a bachelor's degree from the University of Melbourne in December 1962. In the same year, he got a license in optometry from the Victorian College of Optometry. In 1963, he got an invitation to move to Indiana University Bloomington to obtain a Ph.D. under the supervision of Gordon Heath. 

In 1967, he joined the faculty of the UC Berkeley School of Optometry as an assistant professor. Adams was editor-in-chief for Optometry and Vision Science.

Death
Adams died on 16 July 2021.

References

External links
  at the UC Berkeley School of Optometry

1940 births
2021 deaths
American optometrists
University of Melbourne alumni
University of California, Berkeley School of Optometry faculty
Australian emigrants to the United States
Indiana University Bloomington alumni
Medical journal editors
Vision scientists
Scientists from Melbourne
People from Kew, Victoria